The Battle of Nikolayevka was the breakout of Italian forces in January 1943, as a small part of the larger Battle of Stalingrad. The breakout involved the Alpine Army Corps of the Italian 8th Army near the village of Nikolayevka (now Livenka, Belgorod Oblast, in Russia).

Prelude

On December 16, 1942, Soviet forces launched Operation Little Saturn aimed at the Italian 8th Army. The Soviet plan was to force the River Don, encircle and destroy the Italian 8th Army along the Don, then push towards Rostov-on-Don and thus cut off Army Group A fighting in the Caucasus. The Soviet armored columns now rapidly advanced south towards the Black Sea.

The breakout
The Italian Alpine Army Corps (:it:Corpo d'armata alpino), consisting of the 2nd Alpine Division "Tridentina", 3rd Alpine Division "Julia", 4th Alpine Division "Cuneense", and 156th Infantry Division "Vicenza" to their rear, were at this point largely unaffected by the Soviet offensive on their right flank. On January 13, 1943, the Red Army launched the second stage of Operation Saturn. Four armies of General Filipp Golikov's Voronezh Front attacked, encircled, and destroyed the Hungarian Second Army near Svoboda on the Don to the northwest of the Italians and pushed back the remaining units of the German XXIV Army Corps on the Alpini left flank, thus encircling the Alpine Army Corps.

On the evening of 17 January, the Alpine Army Corps commander, General Gabriele Nasci, ordered a full retreat. At this point only the Tridentina division was still capable of conducting effective combat operations. The 40,000-strong mass of stragglers—Alpini and Italians from other commands, plus German and Hungarian Hussars (Light Cavalry) —formed two columns that followed the Tridentina division which, supported by a handful of German armoured vehicles, led the way westwards to the Axis lines.

On the morning of January 26, the spearheads of the Tridentina reached the hamlet of Nikolayevka, occupied by the 48th Guards Rifle Division. The Soviets had fortified the railway embankment on both sides of the village. General Nasci ordered a frontal assault and at 9:30 am the 6th Alpini Regiment with the battalions "Verona", "Val Chiese", and "Vestone", the Tridentina division's II Mixed Engineer Battalion, the Mountain Artillery Group "Bergamo" of the 2nd Mountain Artillery Regiment, and three German Sturmgeschütz III commenced the attack. By noon the Italian forces had reached the outskirts of the village and the Alpine Corps' Chief of Staff General Giulio Martinat brought up reinforcements: the 5th Alpini Regiment with the battalions "Edolo", "Morbegno" and "Tirano", and the remaining mountain artillery groups "Vicenza" and "Valcamonica" of the 2nd Mountain Artillery Regiment, as well as the remnants of the Alpini Battalion "L’Aquila" of the "Julia" division. General Martinat fell during this assault.

By sunset the Alpini battalions were still struggling to break the reinforced Soviet lines and in a last effort to decide the battle before nightfall General Luigi Reverberi, commander of the Tridentina division, ordered the remaining troops and stragglers, which had arrived over the course of the afternoon, to assault the Soviet positions in a human wave attack. The assault managed to break open the Soviet lines and the Italian survivors managed to continue their retreat, which was no longer contested by Soviet forces.

Aftermath
On February 1 the remnants of the Corps reached Axis lines. The Italians suffered heavy losses in the breakout: the Cuneense division had been destroyed; one tenth of the Division Julia survived (approximately 1,200 of 15,000 troops deployed) and one third of the Division Tridentina survived (approximately 4,250 of 15,000 troops deployed).  The "Vicenza" Division that counted 10,466 men at the beginning of the Soviet offensive, 7,760 of which had been killed or were missing after the division's remnants reached Axis lines. In total the corps suffered 34,170 killed in action and 9,400 wounded in action out of 57,000 men at the beginning of the battle.

The battle has become an important point of reference for the Alpini and their fighting spirit. The Alpini Association also supports social programs in the city.

See also
Italian Army in Russia
Italian participation in the Eastern Front

References

Bibliography
 David Glantz and Jonathan House, The Stalingrad Trilogy: Vol. 3. Endgame at Stalingrad: Book 2: December 1942 - February 194, University Press of Kansas, 2014. . 
 Hamilton, H. Sacrifice on the Steppe. Casemate, 2011 (English)
 The Italian War on the Eastern Front, 1941–1943: Operations, Myths and Memories by Bastian Matteo Scianna (2019).
 
"Few Returned" , by Eugenio Corti ( first hand account of the breakout).

Battle of Stalingrad
Battles involving Italy
Battles involving Hungary
Conflicts in 1943
Battles of World War II involving Italy
Battles of World War II involving Hungary
Battles of World War II involving Germany
Battles and operations of the Soviet–German War
History of Belgorod Oblast
1943 in the Soviet Union
Battle of Nikolayevka
January 1943 events